Aeronautical pentathlon at the 2019 Military World Games was held in Wuhan, China from 19 to 24 October 2019.

Medal summary

References 
 2019 Military World Games Results - Page 3

Aeronautical pentathlon
2019